Villa Mordoch (Greek: Βίλα Μορντόχ) is the name of a historic villa of Thessaloniki, Greece on Vasilissis Olgas Avenue.

It was property of the wealthy Salonica Jewish Mordoch family of the city. It was completed in 1905, designed by architect Xenophon Paionidis.

Today it houses public services of the Municipality of Thessaloniki.

References

Buildings and structures in Thessaloniki
Baroque Revival architecture in Greece
Eclectic architecture in Greece
Jews and Judaism in Thessaloniki